The Sunny King Criterium is a criterium cycling race held annually in Anniston, Alabama since 2003.

Winners

Men

Women

References

External links

Cycle races in the United States
Recurring sporting events established in 2003
2003 establishments in Alabama
Sports competitions in Alabama
Anniston, Alabama